Ian Steen (born 30 December 1954) is a Scottish former footballer who played as a forward.

Career 
Steen began his professional career in 1972 with Dundee United but managed just three league appearances before moving to Forfar Athletic in 1975. Steen's single season at Station Park preceded a move to Stranraer, where he spent three years and made just under 100 league appearances. A 1979 move to Raith Rovers brought four years of football in Fife before Steen ended his career with a two-year spell at East Stirlingshire.

After leaving professional football, Steen moved to England for work reasons and played non-league football. He now lives in Peterborough with his wife and two teenage daughters and works in the printing industry.

References

External links
 

1954 births
Living people
Footballers from Dundee
Scottish footballers
Dundee United F.C. players
Forfar Athletic F.C. players
Stranraer F.C. players
Raith Rovers F.C. players
East Stirlingshire F.C. players
Scottish Football League players
Association football midfielders